Kebede is a name of Ethiopian origin. Notable people with the name include:

 Aberu Kebede (born 1989), Ethiopian long distance runner
 Alemayo Kebede (born 1987), Eritrean football midfielder
 Ashenafi Kebede (1938–1998), Ethiopian composer, conductor, ethnomusicologist, historical musicologist, and music educator
 Berhanu Kebede (born 1956), Ethiopian ambassador
 Dawit Kebede (born 1980), Ethiopian journalist
 Endalkachew Kebede (born 1980), Ethiopian boxer
 Getaneh Kebede (born 1992), Ethiopian footballer
 Liya Kebede (born 1978), Ethiopian-born model, maternal health advocate, clothing designer, and actress
 Moges Kebede, Ethiopian author, essayist, and editor
 Semra Kebede (born 1987), Ethiopian beauty pageant titleholder, model, and actress
 Tsegaye Kebede (born 1987), Ethiopian long-distance runner
 Yonathan Kebede (born 1991), Ethiopian soccer player
 Zeritu Kebede (born 1984), Ethiopian singer, songwriter, social activist, actress, and film producer
 Kebede Balcha (born 1951), Ethiopian marathon runner
 Kebede Bedasso (born 1949), Ethiopian sprinter
 Kebede Michael (1916–1998), Ethiopian-born author of both fiction and non-fiction literature

Amharic-language names
Ethiopian given names